Bonstetten is a municipality in the district of Augsburg in Bavaria in Germany.

References

Augsburg (district)